Californië is a hamlet in the Dutch province of Limburg. It is located in the municipality of Horst aan de Maas, about 3 km west of Grubbenvorst and northwest of Venlo.

References

Populated places in Limburg (Netherlands)
Horst aan de Maas